Klaudiusz Kaufmann (born 8 April 1978 in Gliwice) is a film, stage and dubbing actor. He has appeared since 2015 as Wiktor Krol in the famous German series Polizeiruf 110.

Selected filmography
 Pfarrer Braun - Kur mit Schatten 
 Großstadtrevier - Freifahrt
 Polizeiruf 110: Feindbild
 Spies of Warsaw 
 The Passing Bells
 Polizeiruf 110: "Grenzgänger" 
 Polizeiruf 110: "Der Preis der Freiheit" 
  (2010)
 Joanna
 Hans Kloss. Stawka większa niż śmierć

External links 
 

1978 births
Living people
People from Gliwice